Juan de Vich O.P. (died 1526) was a Roman Catholic prelate who served as Bishop of Acerra (1512–1526).

Biography
Juan de Vich was born in Spain and ordained a priest in the Order of Preachers.
On 23 July 1512, he was appointed during the papacy of Pope Julius II as Bishop of Acerra.
He served as Bishop of Acerra until his death in 1526.

References

External links and additional sources
 (for Chronology of Bishops) 
 (for Chronology of Bishops) 

16th-century Italian Roman Catholic bishops
Bishops appointed by Pope Julius II
1526 deaths
Dominican bishops